Malleostemon peltiger is a plant species of the family Myrtaceae endemic to Western Australia.

It blooms between August and November producing pink-white flowers.

It is found on sand plains in the Gascoyne, Mid West and Wheatbelt between Shark Bay and Morawa where it grows in sandy soils.

References

peltiger
Flora of Western Australia
Plants described in 1983